Jan Berg (born 14 May 1965) is a Norwegian former footballer, who played at both professional and international levels as a midfielder.

Career
Berg played club football in Norway and Spain for Molde, Elche and Rayo.

Berg earned 23 caps for Norway between 1982 and 1990 at all senior levels – 15 at full international level, 7 in Olympic Qualifiers, and one at the 1984 Summer Olympics.

Personal life
His brother is Odd Berg.

References

External links
 

1965 births
Living people
Norwegian footballers
Molde FK players
Elche CF players
Rayo Vallecano players
Norway international footballers
Footballers at the 1984 Summer Olympics
Olympic footballers of Norway
People from Molde
Norwegian expatriate footballers
Expatriate footballers in Spain
Eliteserien players
Norwegian First Division players
La Liga players
Segunda División players
Norwegian expatriate sportspeople in Spain
Association football midfielders
Sportspeople from Møre og Romsdal